Lawrence of Arabia: The Authorised Biography of T. E. Lawrence is a book by Jeremy Wilson about the noted historic figure T. E. Lawrence ("Lawrence of Arabia"), who helped lead the Arab Revolt against the Ottoman Empire during World War I. It was published in 1989, first by William Heinemann Ltd., London, then in the United States by Atheneum, New York.

Michael Coren in the Toronto Star described this as "an unremarkable book", but it was named as one of the 14 best books of 1990 by The New York Times. Nigel Nicolson, reviewing for  The New York Times, wrote "This biography will endure beside Seven Pillars as his monument, and any future book about T. E. Lawrence will be but a commentary on it."

References

External links
Lawrence of Arabia, The Authorised Biography: on-line edition (early chapters only)

British biographies
1989 non-fiction books
T. E. Lawrence